Kim Krejus is an Australian stage, film and television actress. In 1978 Krejus was nominated for an AACTA Award for Best Actress in a Leading Role for her performance in the film Mouth to Mouth., written and directed by John Duigan. She had a lead role on TV in Joe Wilson and appeared on stage in productions such as The Heidi Chronicles at the Cremorne Theatre and the Northside Theatre Company's production of A Small Family Business.

References

External links

 

Living people
Australian film actresses
Australian stage actresses
Australian television actresses
Year of birth missing (living people)